Kengeri is a suburb in Bangalore city. It is located on the western corridor along Mysore Road, bordered by Nagarbhavi to the north and Rajarajeshwari Nagar to the east.

History
The name Kengeri comes from the Kannada words Tengu coconut and Keri meaning place. The place is still surrounded by Coconut farms, most of them ruled by Vilperi the Coconut Baron. The place has been ruled by a number of dynasties including Gangas, followed by Cholas. In 1050 AD, Chola king Rajendra Chola erected a Tamil inscription depicting details of grants made to Eshwara Temple at Kengeri. The provinces of Kengeri and surrounding areas came under the control of Kings of Kukkalanadu, who had Kithnahally near Tavarekere as the capital and ruled Nelamangala, Ramanagaram, Bangalore South (Actually, parts of Kanakapura district which was part of Bangalore earlier and was considered Bangalore South) and Magadi taluks. After Hoysala ruler's regime, during the period of Vijayanagar Empire, Kengeri was vested with Yelahanka province administration. Later, when Maratha warrior Shahaji won Bangalore, Kengeri came under Shahaji's regime. During 1677 AD, King of Mysore Chikkadevaraja Wodeyar won Kengeri and was in the province of Mysore.

Tippu Sultan reportedly took shelter in Kengeri Fort while at war with the British. When the English captured Bangalore, the fort was reportedly destroyed to prevent its use. In the survey report prepared by Colonel McKenzie and Bakunin, after death of Tippu, there is mention about remains of Kengeri Fort. The area is now recognised as fort area (Kengeri kote/Kengeri fort).

During Tippu's reign, Kengeri was famous centre for sericulture industry. It is learnt that Tippu for the first time bought foreign knowledge of sericulture and encouraged people to cultivate and produce the same. In 1866, Signor de Vecchi, an Italian, noticing the then depressed condition of the silk industry made efforts with the help of the government for its revival. He also made some scientific study of silkworm rearing and causes for their degeneration. To remedy these defects, silkworm eggs were imported for the first time from Japan and were distributed among the people of the trade.

This brought about revolutionary changes. Finally, a steam factory for silk-filature was established at Kengeri with eight basins. Mostly female orphans from a private Bangalore convent were engaged in the work. The Kengeri Gurukula Vidya Peetha was founded in 1926 by freedom fighters and Gandhians like Dr C B Rama Rao, Swamy Vishwananda, T Ramachandra and K B Purushottam to motivate youngsters to do their bit for social causes.

When Mahatma Gandhi visited the Gurukula twice he guided the youngsters to visit villages and organise people to tackle socio-economic problems in these villages through collective efforts. A memorial building had been built at the premises to commemorate the visits of Mahatma Gandhi.

The Vidyapeetha, an NGO, runs an orphanage, a free residential school and a short-stay-home for underprivileged women hoping for early rehabilitation. In recent years, several industries have come up in and around Kengeri.

BMTC Depots

Kengeri has 2 BMTC depots: Depot-12 located near NICE Road junction and Depot-37 located within Kengeri TTMC.

Many buses ply from Kengeri to different parts of the city including 375D towards Banashankari, 378 towards Electronic City, 401M and 401KB towards Yeshwantpur, 401K towards Yelahanka, 501A and 501C towards Hebbal, 502H towards Chikkabanavara, 502F towards Jalahalli Cross and G6 towards Shantinagar Bus Station. It also acts as an intermediate station for buses between Bidadi and Kempegowda Bus Station/K. R. Market.

Railway station

Kengeri railway station is on the Bangalore-Mysore rail route. Chamundi Express, Mysore-Bangalore Rajya Rani Express, Mysore-Tirupati Fast Passenger, Mysore-Chennai Express, Bangalore City–Karwar Express connecting Bangalore-Mysore, Bangalore-Mangalore and Tuticorin-Mysore Express are the main train connections. The computerised passenger reservation system is in service. The station is served by the South Western Railways.

Bangalore City Railway Station is to the north-east of Kengeri. Travelling south-west, Bidadi railway station is the nearest main station.

Metro
Kengeri metro station was inaugurated on August 29, 2021 and commenced operations on August 30, 2021. It increased the connectivity to Bengaluru city, from the earlier last station on the west side of the Purple Line, Mysore Road metro station.

Satellite town
Kengeri Satellite Town was developed by Bangalore Development Authority over 30 years ago. However, it took a long time for the satellite town to develop. Cyber cafes, telephone booths, multi-cuisine restaurants and other utility services have come up in recent times. Namma Metro purple line has been extended up to Kengeri Satellite Town from the Mysore Road Metro Station. A Traffic Transit Management Centre (TTMC) of the Bangalore Metropolitan Transport Corporation is also being constructed here. It is also close to the Outer Ring Road and thus has good connectivity. The Kengeri Satellite Town Last Bus stop has many eateries apart from housing a number of jewelleries, clothing, gift shops and hospitals. A classical place to revise during the evenings. In view of high rise apartments by KHB on Kommaghatta road, Kengeri Satellite Town Club, 100 ft road from Kengeri to Magadi road, Visweswaraiah layout, Global Village software park. Its good connectivity to the western part of the city Rajajinagar, Malleswaram and Vijay Nagar

Places of worship
The Karadi Betta near Kengeri has an Anjaneya Temple of great antiquity. It is said that the image was found under a tree and the temple was built about 500 years ago. According to a record here, the temple was rebuilt in 1845. Inside the garbhagriha, two inscription slabs carpeted into the floor, one behind and another in front of the main deity, are of Hoysala Narasimha. They announce some grants by the king to one Vechiyana for his military success.  
 
The place has a small but an ancient Eshwara temple near the entrance to Kengeri Fort area. Tamil inscriptions are found in this temple commissioned by the Chola king Rajendra Chola. The Inscription details grants made to this temple.

There is a large Mosque (Masjid) on Bangalore—Mysore highway bang opposite to the old bus stand. The old mosque was demolished and a new mosque has been reconstructed which is a two storied building having a capacity of approximately 2000 people.

For the Christians of different denominations, Christos Mar Thoma Church, St. Francis of Assisi Church, Shalom Church, St. Anthony's Shrine, The Pentecostal Mission Church, New Life AG Church, Paniel Gospel Telugu Church, Hope AG Church, Kengeri Evangelical Worship House, New Jerusalem Prayer House, The Church of Light, Pushpa Sadan Church are the few to name among several more.

Mutts
There is a Bande Mata of the Veerashaivas said to be about 800 years old. It is said that the mata was founded by one Channaveeraswamy who is believed to have been a contemporary of Bijjala, the most famous of the southern Kalachuri kings.  There is also a Kabir Mutt, Shankar Mutt and a Raghavendra Swamy Mutt.

Geography
It has an average elevation of 826 metres (2709 feet).

Demographics
 India census, Kengeri had a population of 42,386. Males constitute 52% of the population and females 48%. Kengeri has an average literacy rate of 75%, higher than the national average of 59.5%: male literacy is 79%, and female literacy is 70%. In Kengeri, 11% of the population is under 6 years of age.

References

Neighbourhoods in Bangalore